Zoji La Tunnel is an under-construction 9.5 m wide, 7.57 m high and 14.2 km long, horseshoe-shaped single-tube, 2 lane road tunnel at the height of 11,575 feet (3,528 m) above sea level which passes under the Zoji La pass in the Himalayas between GANDERBALof kashmir (J&K) and Drass town in Kargil district of Ladakh . Project cost for this smart tunnel (SCADA system), constructed with the New Austrian tunneling method and equipped with CCTV, radio control, uninterrupted power supply, ventilation, etc is INR8,308 (~US$1.04 billion) as per 2021 estimates. Together with the adjacent Z-Morh Tunnel, this geostrategically important tunnel on the NH1 Srinagar-Leh Highway will provide the year around weather-proof connectivity to Ladakh (Leh, LOC, AGPL & LAC) and Baltal (Amarnath cave), reduce the earlier 3.5 hours travel time to just 15 minutes drive, boost the tourism and economy, and enhance the Indian Military logistics. It is one of the 31 road tunnels, 20 in J&K and 11 in Ladakh, being constructed at the combined cost of INR1.4 lakh crore (~US$17.5 billion).

History 

Tunnel completion is expected about 5–7 years after commencement of construction in 2018. The tunnel along with 6.5 km long Z-Morh Tunnel, (which is 22 km before Zoji La tunnel towards Srinagar) will ensure year-round road connectivity between Srinagar and Kargil which currently remains closed for about seven months due to heavy snowfall on the Zoji La pass which is situated at an altitude of 3,528 m (11,578 feet) on the Srinagar-Kargil-Leh highway. Zoji La is 15 km from Sonamarg and provides a vital link with Drass and Kargil in Ladakh but remains closed for 6–7 months (from November to May) during winter due to heavy snow fall & snow avalanches.

It takes more than 3 hours to cross the pass but the tunnel will reduce the time. This tunnel was a strategic requirement of the army and the Ladakhi people as the pass is close to the Line of Control (LOC) and vulnerable to hostile actions. Zoji La was recaptured from Pakistani raiders under Operation Bison.

The Zoji La tunnel project was approved by the Government of India in January 2018 and the commencement of its construction was inaugurated by the Prime Minister Narendra Modi in May 2018. The tunnel will be built under EPC mode (engineering, procurement, construction) wherein the Government of India will provide the money and the executing agency will do the construction and will later hand over the project to the Government of India. Earlier it was supposed to be built under PPP mode where private player was supposed to make the investment and later recover via toll but despite calling for bids five times since 2013, no bid came for one time and for the rest only a single private player showed interest; thus each time the bid was cancelled.

Features

 Its construction period will be five years because of a very difficult terrain where in some areas the temperature drops to -45 °C.

 The project aims at construction of a 14.2 km-long two-lane bi-directional single tube tunnel with a parallel 14.2 km-long egress tunnel. The western portal is at Baltal at about 3,000 m elevation (about 400 m lower than the elevation of the existing highway there), about 15 km east of Sonmarg. The eastern portal after Zoji La is at Minamarg towards the Dras/Kargil end. The length of the tunnel does not include the lengths of the approach roads to both ends of the tunnel from the existing highway.

 Planned as a smart tunnel, it will have the latest safety features such as a fully transverse ventilation system, an uninterrupted power supply, emergency lighting, CCTV monitoring, variable message signs, traffic logging equipment and a tunnel radio system.

 The safety features will include emergency telephones and fire-fighting cabinets every 125 metres, pedestrian cross-passages every 250 metres and motorable cross-passages and lay-bys every 750 metres.

 Earlier the civil construction cost of the project was ₹ 6,575.85 crore. Revised cost total capital cost of the project, including 5% annual inflation, is ₹8,308 crore. It includes the cost of land, resettlement and rehabilitation and other pre-construction activities as well as the maintenance and operation cost of the tunnel for four years.

 Defence forces have to face a hard time ensuring supplies to border posts during winters across Zoji La pass which is most strategic for the entire Kargil sector which has seen intrusion and war in the past. The tunnel will help keep the highway open for the entire year.

Once the tunnel is completed, travel between Srinagar and Ladakh throughout the year will become possible.  The travel time currently between Sonamarg and Meenamarg is four hours, while it will drastically come down to just 40 minutes after this Asia’s longest bidirectional tunnel is completed.

Status updates

 Oct 2013: Cabinet approves the road tunnel project.

 May 2017: Four private players bid for the ₹10,000 crore project namely Larsen & Toubro (L&T), IL&FS, Jaypee Infratech and Reliance Infrastructure.

 Jun 2017: Contract to be awarded to the bidders by June end and work to start in August 2017.

 Jul 2017: IL&FS Transportation Networks Ltd, the firm which developed Dr. Syama Prasad Mookerjee Tunnel emerged as the lowest cost bidder for the tunnel.

 Jan 2018: Union Cabinet approves tunnel to be built at a cost of  including land acquisition cost. Tunnel to be ready in five years.

 May 2018: Foundation stone laid by Prime Minister Narendra Modi and work starts.

 Mar 2019: The project is to be bid again as earlier developer IL&FS has gone bankrupt.

 Jun 2020: Fresh bids invited for construction of tunnel.

 Aug 2020: MEIL (Megha Engineering & Infrastructure Ltd) emerges as lowest bidder for the tender with quoted price of ₹4509 crores. MEIL will construct the tunnel.

 Oct 2020: On 15 October 2020, Minister of Highways, Nitin Gadkari initiated the first blast for the all weather Zoji-la tunnel on NH1. This marked the beginning of the construction of the tunnel. The event was attended by Union Ministers of State Jitendra Singh and V. K. Singh. The tunnel is expected to be completed by September 2026.

Sep 2021: After an inspection by Union Minister Nitin Gadkari, he sets a deadline for the tunnel to be completed by December 2023, much ahead of its original deadline of September 2026.

Nov 2021: Megha Engineering and Infrastructures Ltd (MEIL) completes the excavation work of tunnel 1 of the Zoji-la Tunnel.

 September 2022: Total 2.1 km (15%) tunnelling work out of 14.2 km, 1 km from west or Kashmir side and 1.1 km from east or Ladakh side, has been excavated. Tunnelling work, which started in May 2021, is continuing 24x7 with 1000 engineers and labours even during the freezing winter months, consequently tunnel will be completed much earlier (december 2023) than the original deadline of december 2026.

See also
 India-China Border Roads
 Atal Tunnel under Rohtang Pass
 Chattergala Tunnel
 Dr. Syama Prasad Mookerjee Tunnel between Chenani-Nashri near Patnitop on NH 44 Jammu-Srinagar Highway
 Z-Morh Tunnel
 Meenamarg

References

Road tunnels in Ladakh
Proposed road infrastructure in India
Proposed road tunnels in Asia
Transport in Kargil district